Brigg and Cleethorpes was a constituency on the south bank of the River Humber which returned one Member of Parliament (MP) to the House of Commons of the Parliament of the United Kingdom, elected by the first-past-the-post voting system.

It was created for the 1983 general election, and abolished for the 1997 general election.

History
This safe Conservative seat was held by Michael Brown for the entire period of its existence.

Boundaries
The Borough of Cleethorpes, and the Borough of Glanford wards of Abbey, Barton-upon-Humber Bridge, Barton-upon-Humber Park, Brigg, Goxhill, Humber, Kirton, North Ancholme, Scawby, South Ancholme, Ulceby, Wold, and Wrawby.

The constituency was formed from the eastern part of the Borough of Glanford plus the Borough of Cleethorpes. In 1997, an extra seat was allocated to the Humber, with the result that constituencies in the region needed to cover a smaller population. The new constituency of Cleethorpes was created with this in mind, with the remainder of the constituency forming part of Brigg and Goole.

Members of Parliament

Elections

See also
List of parliamentary constituencies in Humberside

References

Parliamentary constituencies in Lincolnshire (historic)
Constituencies of the Parliament of the United Kingdom established in 1983
Constituencies of the Parliament of the United Kingdom disestablished in 1997
Brigg
Borough of North Lincolnshire